Patrick Ruttle (11 January 1931 – 11 March 2019) was a Canadian field hockey player. He competed in the men's tournament at the 1964 Summer Olympics.

References

External links
 

1931 births
2019 deaths
Canadian male field hockey players
Olympic field hockey players of Canada
Field hockey players at the 1964 Summer Olympics
People from Bray, County Wicklow